The flat-faced fruit-eating bat (Artibeus planirostris) is a South American species of bat in the family Phyllostomidae. It is sometimes considered a subspecies of the Jamaican fruit bat, but can be distinguished by its larger size, the presence of faint stripes on the face, and of a third molar tooth on each side of the upper jaw. Genetic analysis has also shown that the two species may not be closely related.

Description
The fur is brownish-grey over most of the body, becoming grey on the underparts, although there are faint whitish stripes on the face. As their name suggests, the bats have a broad skull with a short snout. The ears are triangular, with rounded tips, although short compared with those of many other bats, and with a small tragus. The snout bears a prominent triangular nose-leaf. The wings are dark brown or blackish, with white tips. A well-developed uropatagium stretches between the legs, but there is no visible tail.

Distribution and habitat
Flat-faced fruit-eating bats are found through much of northern and central South America east of the Andes. They inhabit a range of forested environments from sea level to  elevation, including montane, transitional, and lowland tropical forests and open cerrado habitats. Three subspecies are currently recognised:

 Artibeus planirostris planirostris - eastern Brazil, Paraguay
 Artibeus planirostris fallax - southern Venezuela and Colombia, the Guyanas, through central and western Brazil to eastern Bolivia and extreme northern Argentina
 Artibeus planirostris hercules - eastern Peru, eastern Ecuador

Behaviour and biology
Flat-faced fruit-eating bats are nocturnal and herbivorous. They feed almost entirely on fruit, although they may also eat small quantities of insects and mites. They are active throughout the night, and spend the day roosting in trees. Favoured fruit include those of Vismia trees, figs, and Amazon grape. They are apparently capable of breeding throughout the year, although, in at least some areas, births are more common during the wet season. Gestation lasts at least three and a half months, and results in the birth of a single young.

References

Artibeus
Bats of South America
Bats of Brazil
Mammals of Argentina
Mammals of Bolivia
Mammals of Colombia
Mammals of Ecuador
Mammals of French Guiana
Mammals of Guyana
Mammals of Paraguay
Mammals of Peru
Mammals of Suriname
Mammals of Venezuela
Fauna of the Amazon
Fauna of the Cerrado
Mammals described in 1823
Taxa named by Johann Baptist von Spix
Taxonomy articles created by Polbot